The deepwater burrfish (Allomycterus pilatus) is a porcupinefish of the family Diodontidae, found in the Tasman Sea and off southern Australia. It occurs at depths of 40 to 270 m (131 to 886 ft) in areas off the continental shelf. The species reaches 50 cm (19.7 inches) in total length and is reportedly easily entangled in nets due to its spines and ability to inflate its body. It is the only known member of its genus.

References

External links
 Fishes of Australia : Allomycterus pilatus